{{DISPLAYTITLE:C6H12S2}}
The molecular formula C6H12S2 (molar mass: 148.28 g/mol, exact mass: 148.0380 u) may refer to:

 Allyl propyl disulfide
 1,5-Dithiacyclooctane (DTCO)